"The Matador" is a song co-written and recorded by American country music artist Johnny Cash.  The song was written by Cash and his wife, June Carter Cash.   It was later included on the album Old Golden Throat; along with the b-side "Still in Town".It was released in September 1963.    Cash Box described it as "a medium-paced, chorus-backed Latin-styled romancer with a contagious repeating riff throughout."

Chart performance
The single peaked at number two on the country charts.  "The Matador" also crossed over to the Hot 100, peaking at number 44.

References
 
 

1963 singles
Johnny Cash songs
Songs written by Johnny Cash
Columbia Records singles
1963 songs
Songs written by June Carter Cash
Song recordings produced by Don Law